SEKA Bunkering Stations S.A. is a Greek-based, independent oil company, specializing in ships' fuels and lubricants.

History

SEKA was established in the early 1960s by the late Greek tycoon Nikos Vardinogiannis in Kaloi Limenes, Crete, in Greece. The name is the acronym of the words "Fuels Bunkering Station" ("Stathmos Ephodiasmou Kafsimon") in Greek. The company continues to market ships' fuels and lubricants, from that location as well as from Corinth and Piraeus and is a major bunkering supplier in Greece.

See also

 Energy in Greece

References

External links
Corporate website
National Oil Industry Association, Greece

Oil and gas companies of Greece
Oil terminals